A cloud atlas is a pictorial key to the nomenclature of clouds.

International Cloud Atlas (1896), the first international cloud atlas
A Cloud Atlas (1923), by Alexander George McAdie

Cloud Atlas may also refer to:

Literature
Cloud Atlas (2002), a collection of poems by Donald Platt
Cloud Atlas (novel), a 2004 novel by David Mitchell adapted to film
The Cloud Atlas (2004), a novel by Liam Callanan

Film
Cloud Atlas (film), a 2012 film based on David Mitchell's 2004 novel

Music
Cloud Atlas (starting in 1985), a series of compositions by musician Toshi Ichiyanagi
International Cloud Atlas, a 2007 album by Mikel Rouse